Black Mountain is a lava capped mesa in Pima County, Arizona, that rises 1,000 feet above its base to an altitude of . It is a northeast trending ridge, 5,600 feet in length, located along Mission Road nine miles southwest of Tucson. It is on the San Xavier Indian Reservation, 3.18 miles southwest of the Mission San Xavier del Bac. The Sierrita Mountains rise to the southwest and the Santa Cruz River is about four miles to the east.

On top of Black Mountain are the ruins of an ancient Hohokam fortification. Long stone walls, circular stone rings, petroglyphs, man-made trails, and pottery sherds can still be seen today. However, the site is on reservation land, and is therefore not open to the general public.

See also

 List of mountains in Arizona
 Tumamoc Hill

References

Mesas of Arizona
Mountains of Arizona
Archaeological sites in Arizona
Landforms of Pima County, Arizona
Geography of Tucson, Arizona
Tohono O'odham Nation
Petroglyphs in Arizona
Hohokam trincheras sites
Hohokam rock art sites
Mountains of Pima County, Arizona